The historic Pacific Electric Building (also known as the Huntington Building, after the railway’s founder, Henry Huntington, or simply “6th & Main”), opened in 1905 in the core of Los Angeles as the main train station for the Pacific Electric Railway, as well as the company's headquarters; Main Street Station served passengers boarding trains for the south and east of Southern California. The building was designed by architect Thornton Fitzhugh. Though not the tallest in Los Angeles, its ten floors enclosed the greatest number of square feet in any building west of Chicago for many decades. Above the train station, covering the lower floors, were five floors of offices; and in the top three was the Jonathan Club, one of the city's leading businessmen's clubs introduced by magnates from the Northeast. After the “Great Merger” of Pacific Electric into Southern Pacific Railroad in 1911, the PE Building became the home of Southern Pacific in Los Angeles. In 1925, a second electric rail hub, the Subway Terminal, was opened near Pershing Square to serve the north and west.

History

Inerurban terminal

The building opened on January 15, 1905 as a terminal for the electric railways being constructed by Henry Huntington. In 1914, a total of 1,626 scheduled Pacific Electric trains entered or left Los Angeles at Main Street Station in 3262 interurban car trips daily. The elevated tracks and passenger concourse on the back of the building were constructed in 1916.

With the great rise in the number of automobiles in the 1920s, congestion — from the cars, from sharing streets with the cars, from sharing the streets with Los Angeles Railway’s Yellow Cars — often caused PE trains to run late, especially while traveling north on Main Street towards Glendale, and west to Hollywood and Santa Monica. To relieve such problems, the California Railroad Commission issued Order No. 9928 in 1922, which called for the Pacific Electric to build a subway to leave downtown's busy streets. The Subway Terminal Building, a second PE terminal, was then built across downtown at the base of Bunker Hill at 4th and Hill Streets by Pershing Square to serve the subway, which opened December 1, 1925, speeding passenger service considerably to Hollywood, Santa Monica, San Fernando, and Glendale.

Interurban rail service remained the 6th and Main PE Terminal's sole function until 1942. Trains entered the back (east side) on ground-level track from San Pedro Street, loaded and unloaded passengers inside the building concourse, then exited onto Main Street (west side) and turned north or south. (See the attached photograph accompanying this article.) In 1942, the terminal was converted to accommodate the Pacific Electric's growing fleet of buses. Trains continued to enter and use the original concourse on New Year's Day to carry crowds to and from the Tournament of Roses events in Pasadena until 1950 when Northern District (Pasadena–Sierra Madre–Monrovia–Glendora) rail service was abandoned. After that, the PE concourse saw no trains and Main Street tracks were no longer used. Remaining service to Glendora, the Harbor, and to Bellflower was provided at the rear of the PE terminal on outdoor passenger loading platforms and stub tracks at the rear (east side) of the PE Terminal. Trains used a ramp up from San Pedro Street that crossed Los Angeles Street to reach the loading platforms. Passengers walked into the terminal concourse via an enclosed bridge.

Over the next decade, interurban rail routes to Bellflower, the Watts local, and Long Beach and harbor area were abandoned and replaced by motor coaches. The last active route was the Long Beach Line. The final "Blimp" multiple unit interurban train to use the terminal (so named for their unusual plump size and round front windows) to Long Beach was on April 9, 1961 and was in MTA green livery: no longer painted the famous and classic Pacific Electric red. MTA Bus service continued to operate from Sixth and Main until 1964. The MTA ran "Freeway Flyer" motor coach service to old PE destinations from the basement of the nearby Greyhound Terminal, and this continued during Rapid Transit District (SCRTD) operations.

After rail service
Following the closure of the terminal's main floor depot, the former waiting room and bus concourse were converted to a parking garage. With the commercial and social decline of Main Street and the east side of downtown in general, the rented offices on the upper floors of the building became less desirable and gradually emptied out. The building was largely vacant for many years, though it became a popular location for the movie and television industries. Over 400 location shoots have taken place there, including scenes from Forrest Gump, LA Confidential, Jumpin' Jack Flash and interior shots for the 1970s Streets of San Francisco TV series.

In 1908, Cole's Pacific Electric Buffet was opened on the lower floor of the building. Cole's claimed to be Los Angeles' oldest restaurant and pub that has been in operation since its founding, although it was closed in 2007 for renovation, reopening in December 2008. It is one of two local establishments which lay claim to having invented the French dip sandwich. Additionally, the structure held the architectural offices of Greene and Greene circa 1905.

In 2005, the building was converted by ICO Group into residential live/work lofts and is occupied by residents. Several commercial tenants have filled the first floor spaces along 6th Street. The original Cole's space was renovated and divided to add another restaurant and bar. The building lobby currently displays a number of artifacts left over from its days as once an exceptionally active interurban rail terminal. "DANGER" warnings are set into the sidewalk at the Main Street location where trains once entered and left the building, remaining as evidence of its original grand purpose.

See also
 Pacific Electric Railway
 Subway Terminal Building

Notes

References

Bibliography

Further reading

Crump, Spencer: Henry Huntington and the Pacific Electric Railway: A Pictorial Album, (1982) 112 pages. Trans-Anglo Books, Corona Del Mar, CA.
Swett, Ira L.: Lines of Pacific Electric, Interurbans Special #16, (1953), and supplements (1954-1960). Interurbans, Glendale, CA.

External links

History of PE Building: Electric Railway Historical Association of Southern California article
Emporis Buildings entry for Pacific Electric Lofts
History and photos: Los Angeles Conservancy and Los Angeles City and Library article. 
Article from 1917 Transit Journal with original floor plan
Pacific Electric Lofts Commercial website of developers for the Pacific Electric Building conversion.

Pacific Electric stations
Office buildings in Los Angeles
Buildings and structures in Downtown Los Angeles
Headquarters in the United States
Residential buildings in Los Angeles
Railway stations on the National Register of Historic Places in Los Angeles
Abandoned rapid transit stations
Office buildings completed in 1905
1905 establishments in California
1900s architecture in the United States
Railway stations in the United States opened in 1905
Railway stations closed in 1961
Main Street (Los Angeles)
Repurposed railway stations in the United States
Adaptive reuse of industrial structures in Greater Los Angeles